Frank Olof Odberg (1 March 1879 – 1917) was a Belgian rower who competed in the 1900 Summer Olympics. He was a member of the Belgian club Royal Club Nautique de Gand and with his team, he won the silver medal in the men's eight.

References

External links

1879 births
1917 deaths
Belgian male rowers
Olympic rowers of Belgium
Rowers at the 1900 Summer Olympics
Olympic silver medalists for Belgium
Olympic medalists in rowing
Medalists at the 1900 Summer Olympics
European Rowing Championships medalists
20th-century Belgian people
Date of death missing
Place of death missing
Royal Club Nautique de Gand rowers